Metarctia haematica is a moth of the subfamily Arctiinae. It was described by William Jacob Holland in 1893. It is found in Angola, Cameroon, the Central African Republic, the Republic of the Congo, the Democratic Republic of the Congo, Gabon, Ghana, Guinea, Kenya, Nigeria, Tanzania and Uganda.

References

 

Metarctia
Moths described in 1893